Ernesto Oscar Albarracín  is an Argentine football midfielder who played for Argentina in the 1934 FIFA World Cup. He has also played for Club Sportivo Buenos Aires.

References

External links
FIFA profile

Argentina international footballers
Association football midfielders
1934 FIFA World Cup players
Argentine footballers
Argentine people of Spanish descent
Year of birth missing